McShine is a surname, and may refer to:

 Arthur Hugh McShine, Chief Judge of Trinidad and Tobago
 Kynaston McShine (1935–2018), Trinidadian curator
 Leonora Pujadas-McShine (1910–1995), Trinidadian women's rights activist and community worker
 Pilar McShine (born 1987), Trinidad and Tobago middle distance runner
 Wendell McShine, artist